Michael Denis Wegener (born October 8, 1946) is a former Major League Baseball pitcher. The right-hander was signed by the Baltimore Orioles before the 1964 season, drafted by the Philadelphia Phillies from the Orioles in the 1964 first-year draft (November 30), and later drafted by the Montreal Expos from the Phillies as the 15th pick in the 1968 MLB expansion draft. He played for the Expos from 1969 to 1970. He was born in Denver, Colorado.

Wegener is perhaps best known for giving up Willie Mays's 3000th hit on July 18, 1970. He would allow eight runs in that game (four earned) as the Giants defeated the Expos 10–1.

The majority of his 57 appearances were as a starter, but he did relieve in 15 games. He had "good stuff" but was prone to wildness, as evidenced by 152 bases on balls and 17 wild pitches in just 270 innings. His BB/9IP was 5.07, much higher than the National League average at that time.

Career highlights include:
a four-hit, complete game shutout against the San Francisco Giants (June 14, 1969)
going 3-for-4 with 4 RBI and pitching the first 7.2 innings of an 11–4 victory over the New York Mets. (July 11, 1969)
pitched 11 innings with 15 strikeouts, giving up just 2 runs (both unearned), with no decision, against the New York Mets (September 10, 1969)
a three-hit, seven strikeout complete game against the Chicago Cubs, winning 8–2 (September 15, 1969)
a seven-hit, six strikeout complete game against the Chicago Cubs, winning 6–2 (August 5, 1970)

Wegener hit well for a pitcher, with 9 runs batted in and a batting average of .193 in just 88 lifetime at bats. He was also an excellent fielding pitcher, handling 63 out of 64 total chances successfully for a fielding percentage of .984.

He finished his career with a total of 8 wins, 20 losses, and an ERA of 4.73.

References

External links

1946 births
Living people
Baseball players from Denver
American expatriate baseball players in Canada
Major League Baseball pitchers
Montreal Expos players
Los Angeles Dodgers players
California Angels players
San Diego Padres (minor league) players
Miami Marlins (FSL) players
Tidewater Tides players
Phoenix Giants players
Winnipeg Whips players
Peninsula Whips players
Bluefield Orioles players
Bakersfield Bears players